Robert Stone Higgins (September 23, 1886 – May 25, 1941) was a Major League Baseball catcher. He played all or part of three seasons in the majors, between 1909 and 1912.

External links

1886 births
1941 deaths
Major League Baseball catchers
Cleveland Naps players
Brooklyn Dodgers players
Baseball players from Tennessee
Peoria Distillers players
Chattanooga Lookouts players
Indianapolis Indians players
Toronto Maple Leafs (International League) players
Newark Indians players
New Orleans Pelicans (baseball) players
Atlanta Crackers players
Asheville Tourists players
Asheville Tourists managers
People from Fayetteville, Tennessee
Charleston Broom Corn Cutters players
Shelbyville Queen Citys players